Radical 144 or radical walk enclosure meaning "" or "" is one of the 29 Kangxi radicals (214 radicals in total) composed of 6 strokes.

In the Kangxi Dictionary, there are 53 characters (out of 49,030) to be found under this radical.

 is not used as an indexing component (radical) in Simplified Chinese. Characters with this radical are classified under radical 彳 (No. 60 in the Kangxi Dictionary; No. 41 in the Table of Indexing Chinese Character Components) in Simplified Chinese.

Evolution

Derived characters

Literature

External links

Unihan Database - U+884C

144